Hikmat Hashimov (born 12 November 1979) is an Uzbek footballer who plays as a midfielder for Metallurg Bekabad. He measures 185 cm tall and weighs 75 kg.

Club career
Hashimov's football career began at the club Dustlik Jangibazar. In 2001, he made his debut in the colors of Uzbekistan in the first division. Later that same year he went to So'g'diyony Dżyzak. In 2003-2004 he played in Metallurgu Bekobod and in the years 2005–2006 in Lokomotivie Tashkent. In 2007, he moved to Nasafu Karshi, and in 2010 he returned to Metallurg Bekobod.

International career 
Hashimov debuted for the national team of Uzbekistan in 2007. In the same year he was appointed by coach Rauf Inileyeva to the squad for the Asian Cup 2007. He played in one game against Iran (1:2).

References

External links
 

1979 births
Living people
Uzbekistani footballers
Uzbekistan international footballers
2007 AFC Asian Cup players
Association football midfielders